,(born August 15, 1972) is a Japanese retired mixed martial artist and professional wrestler, mostly known for his work in Pro Wrestling Zero1 and Hustle.

A professional MMA competitor from 1996 until 2010, he competed for the UFC, PRIDE Fighting Championships, PRIDE Fighting Championships, Pancrase, DEEP, RINGS, and M-1 Global.

Mixed martial arts career
After a career of judo and amateur wrestling at the Tokyo University, Fujii learned mixed martial arts on the Super Tiger Gym of Satoru Sayama and debuted for Shooto in 1997.

Ultimate Fighting Championship
Fujii made his debut in Ultimate Fighting Championship during the UFC 23 tournament in Japan, where he first faced the newcomer Masutatsu Yano. The bout started slow, with Fujii defending with strikes and submissions attempts against his opponent's wrestling acumen, but in the second round, Fujii stunned Yano with punches and scored the knockout victory.

He advanced to the next round and found himself against fellow shoot-style practitioner Kenichi Yamamoto, a former apprentice of both Nobuhiko Takada and Akira Maeda. The heavier Fujii controlled the takedowns and applied ground and pound through the guard, threatening with a leglock attempt at the end of the round. At the second, Yamamoto pulled guard and Fujii repeated his strategy, but this time Yamamoto caught Fujii with a kneebar from the bottom, making him tap out.

PRIDE Fighting Championships
After joining Naoya Ogawa's team in Universal Fighting-Arts Organization, Fujii got to debut in PRIDE Fighting Championships in May 2004. His first bout was against Korean newcomer Jin O Kim, whom Fujii dominated with knees and punches before submitting him to a rear naked choke.

Fujii then was pitted against the returning Igor Vovchanchyn, former runner-up to the PRIDE Openweight Grand Prix 2000. Immediately overpowered by Vovchanchyn, the Japanese tried to avoid his striking, which gained him a red card. Minutes later, Vovchanchyn dropped Fujii and finished him with soccer kicks.

Professional wrestling career

Pro Wrestling Zero-One (2003-2004)
He was introduced in Zero-One in January 2003 as a new ally to his mentor Ogawa. Immediately after, Fujii and him challenged the reigning NWA Intercontinental Tag Team Champions, Matt Ghaffari and Tom Howard, but were defeated. Fujii remained as a Japanese loyalist, teaming up with native wrestlers against Ghaffari and his American faction from UPW, while also doing small appearances for shoot-style wrestling promotion U-style, founded by Kiyoshi Tamura.

Ogawa and him teamed up again in July, when they competed at the OH Tag Festival. They were successful, reaching the finals after eliminating Howard' and Ghaffari's own teams, as well as Mexican legends Dos Caras Jr. and Lizmark Jr., and then defeated Kevin Randleman and The Predator at the finals to win the tournament. Fujii also followed this victory by winning also the U-style tournament Kiyoshi Tamura Challenger, earning him a match against Tamura which Katsuhisa lost. Ogawa and him kept teaming until the end of the year, when they both left Zero-One for Hustle.

Hustle (2004-2006)
Fujii wrestled in Hustle as a member of Ogawa's Hustle Army. Being given the nickname of "Shamoji" ("Gamecock") by Ogawa, Fujii was portrayed here as an optimistic underdog who always tried his best despite constantly failing. It was better exemplified by his finishing move, a diving elbow drop ironically baptized as AHE or Atareba Hyappatsuhyakuchu Elbow (translated as "100% Hitting Chance Elbow"), which he constantly boasted of, yet never managed to land on his opponent due to the long range he chose to execute it. He battled repeatedly the forces of Generalissimo Takada's Monster Army over the years, getting occasional wins in tag team matches, until leaving Hustle in March 2006.

Championships and accomplishments
Pancrase Hybrid Wrestling
2000 Pancrase Heavyweight Championship Tournament Runner-up
Ultimate Fighting Championship
UFC 23 Heavyweight Tournament Runner-up
U-STYLE
Kiyoshi Tamura Challenger Tournament (2003)

Mixed martial arts record

|-
| Loss
| align=center| 9–18–1
| Ryuta Noji
| TKO (punches)
| DEEP: 46 Impact
| 
| align=center| 1 
| align=center| 3:18
| Tokyo, Japan
|Light Heavyweight bout.
|-
| Loss
| align=center| 9–17–1
| Choi Mu-Bae
| Decision (unanimous)
| Pancrase: Changing Tour 3
| 
| align=center| 2
| align=center| 5:00
| Tokyo, Japan
| 
|-
| Loss
| align=center| 9–16–1
| Lee Sang-Soo
| TKO (punches)
| DEEP: Gladiator
| 
| align=center| 1
| align=center| 4:36
| Okayama, Japan
| 
|-
| Loss
| align=center| 9–15–1
| Jessie Gibbs
| TKO (knees and punches)
| M-1 Challenge 5: Japan
| 
| align=center| 1
| align=center| 1:34
| Tokyo, Japan
| 
|-
| Loss
| align=center| 9–14–1
| Akhmet Sultanov
| Submission (armbar)
| M-1 Challenge 2: Russia
| 
| align=center| 1
| align=center| 0:54
| St. Petersburg, Russia
| 
|-
| Loss
| align=center| 9–13–1
| Yasuhito Namekawa
| Decision (majority)
| DEEP: 32 Impact
| 
| align=center| 2
| align=center| 5:00
| Tokyo, Japan
|Light Heavyweight bout.
|-
| Win
| align=center| 9–12–1
| Yuji Sakuragi
| Decision (majority)
| DEEP: Glove
| 
| align=center| 2
| align=center| 5:00
| Tokyo, Japan
| 
|-
| Loss
| align=center| 8–12–1
| Jyunpei Hamada
| Decision (split)
| MARS 6: Rapid Fire
| 
| align=center| 2
| align=center| 5:00
| Yokohama, Japan
|95 kg (209.4 lbs) bout.
|-
| Loss
| align=center| 8–11–1
| Elvis Sinosic
| Submission (armbar)
| X-plosion: X-plosion
| 
| align=center| 1
| align=center| N/A
| Australia
| 
|-
| Loss
| align=center| 8–10–1
| Igor Vovchanchyn
| KO (punches)
| PRIDE Bushido 5
| 
| align=center| 1
| align=center| 4:02
| Osaka, Japan
| 
|-
| Win
| align=center| 8–9–1
| Jin O Kim
| Submission (rear-naked choke)
| PRIDE Bushido 3
| 
| align=center| 1
| align=center| 2:58
| Yokohama, Japan
| 
|-
| Win
| align=center| 7–9–1
| Hiroya Takada
| Decision (majority)
| Pancrase: 2002 Anniversary Show
| 
| align=center| 3
| align=center| 5:00
| Yokohama, Japan
| 
|-
| Loss
| align=center| 6–9–1
| Mikhail Ilyukhin
| Submission (guillotine choke)
| PC: Premium Challenge
| 
| align=center| 1
| align=center| 5:45
| Tokyo, Japan
| 
|-
| Win
| align=center| 6–8–1
| Mike Thomas
| Submission (kneebar)
| TF: Tropical Fights 3
| 
| align=center| 1
| align=center| N/A
| Tahiti
| 
|-
| Loss
| align=center| 5–8–1
| Hirotaka Yokoi
| Decision (unanimous)
| RINGS: World Title Series Grand Final
| 
| align=center| 3
| align=center| 5:00
| Yokohama, Japan
| 
|-
| Loss
| align=center| 5–7–1
| Kazuo Takahashi
| TKO (punches)
| Pancrase: Proof 7
| 
| align=center| 1
| align=center| 1:12
| Yokohama, Japan
| 
|-
| Win
| align=center| 5–6–1
| Osami Shibuya
| Decision (unanimous)
| Pancrase: 2001 Anniversary Show
| 
| align=center| 3
| align=center| 5:00
| Kanagawa, Japan
| 
|-
| Win
| align=center| 4–6–1
| Jason DeLucia
| TKO (knee injury)
| Pancrase: 2001 Anniversary Show
| 
| align=center| 1
| align=center| 5:00
| Kanagawa, Japan
| 
|-
| Loss
| align=center| 3–6–1
| Antônio Rogério Nogueira
| Technical Submission (armbar)
| DEEP: 2nd Impact
| 
| align=center| 1
| align=center| 3:59
| Yokohama, Japan
| 
|-
|  Loss
| align=center| 3–5–1
| Marcelo Tigre
| Submission (rear-naked choke)
| DEEP: 1st Impact
| 
| align=center| 2
| align=center| 2:27
| Nagoya, Japan
|
|-
|  Draw
| align=center| 3–4–1
| Jason DeLucia
| Draw
| Pancrase: Trans 7
| 
| align=center| 1
| align=center| 15:00
| Tokyo, Japan
| 
|-
| Win
| align=center| 3–4
| Johnny Huskey
| Submission (keylock)
| Pancrase: Trans 6
| 
| align=center| 1
| align=center| 1:40
| Tokyo, Japan
| 
|-
| Loss
| align=center| 2–4
| Kenichi Yamamoto
| Submission (kneebar)
| UFC 23
| 
| align=center| 1
| align=center| 4:15
| Tokyo, Japan
| 
|-
| Win
| align=center| 2–3
| Masutatsu Yano
| TKO (punches)
| UFC 23
| 
| align=center| 2
| align=center| 3:12
| Tokyo, Japan
| 
|-
| Loss
| align=center| 1–3
| Kohei Sato
| TKO (punches)
| Shooto: Renaxis 2
| 
| align=center| 1
| align=center| 4:05
| Tokyo, Japan
| 
|-
| Win
| align=center| 1–2
| Daniel Quonian
| TKO (punches)
| Shooto: Reconquista 2
| 
| align=center| 1
| align=center| 0:44
| Tokyo, Japan
|Heavyweight debut.
|-
| Loss
| align=center| 0–2
| David Paaluhi
| TKO (punches)
| SB 2: SuperBrawl 2
| 
| align=center| 1
| align=center| 0:55
| Honolulu, Hawaii, United States
|For SuperBrawl Middleweight (80 kg) Tournament Championship.
|-
| Loss
| align=center| 0–1
| Ryuta Sakurai
| Decision
| Lumax Cup: Tournament of J '96
| 
| align=center| 2
| align=center| 3:00
| Japan
|

References

External links
 
 

1972 births
Living people
Japanese male mixed martial artists
Heavyweight mixed martial artists
Mixed martial artists utilizing judo
Mixed martial artists utilizing wrestling
People from Fukuyama, Hiroshima
Ultimate Fighting Championship male fighters
Japanese male judoka
Japanese male sport wrestlers
Amateur wrestlers
Japanese male professional wrestlers